Buddhānusmṛti (Sanskrit; Pali: Buddhānussati), meaning "Buddha-mindfulness", is a common Buddhist practice in all Buddhist traditions which involves meditating on the virtues of the Buddha, mainly Gautama Buddha as the meditation or contemplation subject. Later Mahayana sects like Pureland Buddhism focused on Amida Buddha instead, mainly to pray for rebirth in the Western Pure Land.

Gatha 
The most widely used meditation text in Theravada Buddhism, the Visuddhimagga uses the following 'Buddhānussati Gatha' for contemplation of the Buddha's nine qualities In Pali (Nava Guna):

Its Sanskrit counterpart, which occurs in many Mahayana Sutras and in Āryatriratnānusmṛti sūtra, is given as:

This Gatha can be translated in English as:

Theravada
In all Theravada countries chanting, devotion (bhatti) and worship (puja) is a big part of lay and monastic Buddhist practice, and devotional chants which praise the qualities of the Buddha are widely used. Buddhānussati is considered one of the four "Guardian meditations", as well as part of the "Ten Recollections" and the "forty meditation subjects" (Kammaṭṭhāna) which also includes recollection of the Dharma, Sangha, morality, generosity and Devas. According to Thanissaro Bhikkhu, recollection of the Buddha is meant to "induce a sense of joy and confidence (pasada) in the practice" that "can bring the mind to concentration and cleanse it of defilement." In the Pali Nikayas' mention of the ten recollections, Buddhānussaṭi is defined thus:

Buddhagosa's exposition in the Visuddhimagga states that this practice endows one with confidence, mindfulness, understanding and merit. He also states that the practitioner "comes to feel as if he were living in the Master's presence."

According to the 'Netti Sutta' of the Abhidhamma Pitaka a yogin who wishes to practice Buddhānussaṭi can use Buddha statues to practice.

In the Tantric Theravada tradition, Buddha-mindfulness visualizations are also practiced. Dhammakaya meditation, which was influenced by this Southern tantric tradition, uses the visualization of a clear crystal Buddha image at the center of the body and the repetition of the mantra Sammā-Arahaṃ.

Agamas 
The Ekottara-agama (EA) also contains various unique passages on buddhānusmṛti not found in the Pali Nikayas. EA III, 1 (Taisho Vol. II, p. 554a7-b9) states that buddhānusmṛti can lead to the unconditioned, nirvana, as well as magic power.

This sutra states:A bhiksu correct in body and correct in mind sits crosslegged and focuses his thought in front of him. Without entertaining any other thought he earnestly calls to mind [anusmr-] the Buddha. He contemplates the image of the Tathagata without taking his eyes off it. Not taking his eyes off it he then calls to mind the qualities of the Tathagata - the Tathagata's body made of vajra, endowed with the ten Powers [bala], and by virtue of the four Assurances [vaisaradya] intrepid in assemblies; the Tathagata's countenance, upright and peerless, so that one never tires of beholding it; his perfection of the moral qualities [sila] resembling va]rain indestructibility, like vaidurya in flawless purity; the Tathagata's samadhis never diminishing, calm, ever tranquil, without any extraneous thought, having stilled arrogance, brutality, and the emotions, having eliminated thoughts of desire, of anger, of delusion, apprehension, and all meshes of the net; the Tathagata's body of wisdom [prajña], its knowledge unlimited and unobstructed; the Tathagata's body perfected in liberation [vimukti], done with all destinies and no longer subject to rebirth with such words as: "I must again plunge into Samsara!"; the Tathagata's body, a city of the knowledge and vision of liberation [vimukti-jñana-darsana], knowing the faculties of others and whether or not they shall be liberated, whether, dying here, being reborn there, they shall go on revolving in Samsara until Samsara ends, knowing them all, those who possess liberation and those who do not.

Mahayana

While in Theravada Buddhism, this practice is collectively to all Buddhas(of past, present and future), in Mahayana Buddhism Buddhānussaṭi and related mindfulness practices are also specialized to specific Buddhas or Bodhisattvas such as  Amitabha, Maitreya, Avalokiteshvara and Tara. These practices also sometimes involve mental visualization of their physical qualities, bodies and 'Buddha fields'. According to Paul Williams, the development of Mahayana Buddhānussaṭi practices can be traced to the Buddhist meditation teachers of Kashmir who composed several sutras which emphasized mindfulness of Buddhas. One of the earliest sutras which mentions mindfulness of Amitabha Buddha is the Pratyutpanna Samādhi Sūtra (translated into Chinese in 179 CE). This sutra, and others such as the Amitayurdhyana Sutra, include lengthy descriptions of the Buddha Amitabha's physical qualities and of his Pure land which are used in practices that are meant to allow the meditator to access the Pure Land of Sukhavati, worship Amitabha directly and receive teachings from Amitabha. In Pure Land Buddhism this practice is called Nianfo, and the Infinite Life Sutra says that if one practices visualization meditation on the Buddha Amitabha, upon death one will have a vision of Amitabha who will then take them to the Pure Land. Recollection of the names of the eighty-eight Buddhas is also a common practice among Buddhists.

In Vajrayana Buddhism, a tantric type of Buddhānussaṭi is developed in a practice called deity yoga (Tibetan: lha'i rnal 'byor; Sanskrit: Devata-yoga) which is classified as an Inner Tantra. The practice of Deity Yoga involves the use of a Mandala image, mantra recitation and visualization of a chosen meditation deity called a Yidam. There are various types of Deity Yoga. One of the practices involves the meditator visualizing the Deity in front of them and another involves the meditator visualizing themselves as their chosen Deity and their surroundings with the elements of their Yidam's Mandala. According to Shangpa Rinpoche, this is the most common type of meditation in Vajrayana Buddhism.

See also
Anussati
Ānāpānasati
Ānāpānasati Sutta
Kāyagatāsati Sutta
Buddhist meditation
Samatha & Vipassanā
Buddhist chant
Bhakti
Prostration

References

External links

Buddhist meditation
Spiritual faculties
Mindfulness (Buddhism)